Landeros is a surname. Notable people with this name include:

 Gerardo Vargas Landeros (born 1962), Mexican businessman 
 Gilberto Landeros Briseño, Mexican Army brigadier general
 Nikko Landeros (born 1989), ice hockey player
 Rob Landeros, computer game designer

See also
 Landeros v. Flood, 1976 lawsuit
 Landero surname page